The Billings Montana Temple is the 66th operating temple of the Church of Jesus Christ of Latter-day Saints  in Billings, Montana, United States.

History
Plans to build a temple in Montana were announced in August 1996. About 4,800 people gathered during a spring snowstorm to witness the groundbreaking on March 28, 1998.

Eight dedicatory sessions were held to accommodate all of the members of the area on November 20–21, 1999. church president Gordon B. Hinckley gave the dedicatory prayer.

The single spire rises from a tiered tower. Stained-glass windows dominate the west end. Inside, a clear skylight allows patrons to glimpse the angel Moroni atop the spire. The exterior features Wyoming white dolomite with tan sandstone finish. The temple is used by the 36,000 members in Montana and northern Wyoming.

In 2020, the Billings Montana Temple was closed in response to the coronavirus pandemic.

See also

 The Church of Jesus Christ of Latter-day Saints in Montana
 Comparison of temples of The Church of Jesus Christ of Latter-day Saints
 List of temples of The Church of Jesus Christ of Latter-day Saints
 List of temples of The Church of Jesus Christ of Latter-day Saints by geographic region
 Temple architecture (Latter-day Saints)

Additional reading

References

External links
 
Billings Montana Temple Official site
Billings Montana Temple at ChurchofJesusChristTemples.org

20th-century Latter Day Saint temples
Buildings and structures in Billings, Montana
Religious buildings and structures in Montana
Temples (LDS Church) completed in 1999
Temples (LDS Church) in the United States
1999 establishments in Montana
The Church of Jesus Christ of Latter-day Saints in Montana
Religious organizations based in Montana